Sir Victor Alexander Wrottesley, 12th Baronet Wrottesley, 4th Baron Wrottesley (18 September 1873 – 1 September 1962) was a British peer.

Biography
Wrottesley was the 3rd son of Arthur Wrottesley, 3rd Baron Wrottesley and his wife the Hon. Augusta Elizabeth Denison, daughter of Albert Denison, 1st Baron Londesborough. By 1901 he was farming at New House, Ewhurst, Sussex. He had returned to the family seat, Wrottesley Hall, by 1926, where he lived until his death in 1962.

He was predeceased by his two older brothers and took his seat in the House of Lords on the death of his father in 1910.

He died in September 1962, aged 88, and was succeeded in the baronetcy and barony by his nephew Richard John Wrottesley, 5th Baron Wrottesley.

See also
 Baron Wrottesley, and The Wrottesley Baronetcy
 Wrottesley Hall, Staffordshire

References
Kidd, Charles, Williamson, David (editors). Debrett's Peerage and Baronetage (1990 edition). New York: St Martin's Press, 1990.
The National Archives, London, England
Oxford men & their colleges, Joseph Foster, eBook Page 143 of 143

External links 

1873 births
1962 deaths
Barons in the Peerage of the United Kingdom
Eldest sons of British hereditary barons